"Home with You" is a song recorded by American singer Madison Beer. It was released on February 2, 2018 as the third single from her debut extended play (EP), As She Pleases (2018).

Composition
"Home with You" has been described as a "self-assured anthem" over a tropical beat. The song's lyrical content has been described as "a woman standing up for herself and not caving to someone else’s sexual desires". Its chorus consists of the lyrics: "I ain’t got no time for no games. Tell me what you like, but it’s never gonna change. So you do what you wan-wanna do. And I’m not going home with you".

Critical reception
Mike Nied of Idolator called the song and music video "a vibrant release that is sure to resonate with the hitmaker’s fans". MTV UK wrote the song contains "quite a powerful and poignant tone - all the meanwhile being so dance-able and so easy to sing along to".

Commercial performance
"Home with You" peaked at number 22 on the US Mainstream Top 40 Airplay chart, but failed to chart on the main Billboard Hot 100, or even enter the Bubbling Under Hot 100 Singles as well as any remaining Billboard component charts such as the Digital Songs or Streaming Songs charts altogether.

Track listing
Remixes EP

 "Home with You" (Alphalove Remix) – 4:43
 "Home with You" (Blu-Rey and Tone Terra Remix) – 3:06

Music video
An accompanying music video for "Home With You" was released on June 14, 2018. It consists of lo-fi shots and visual effects, as well as scenes of the singer in a skate park and a bar, as well as dancers.

Charts

Certifications

References

Songs written by Raye (singer)
2018 songs
Songs written by Jin Jin (musician)
Songs written by Leroy Clampitt